The Waley-Cohen Baronetcy, of Honeymead in the county of Somerset, is a title in the Baronetage of the United Kingdom. It was created on 11 December 1961 for Sir Bernard Waley-Cohen, Lord Mayor of London from 1960 to 1961 and the son of Robert Waley Cohen. Born Bernard Nathaniel Waley Cohen, he assumed by deed poll his last forename as an additional surname in 1950. As of 2012 the title is held by his son, the second Baronet, who succeeded in 1991.

Waley-Cohen baronets, of Honeymead (1961)
Sir Bernard Nathaniel Waley-Cohen, 1st Baronet (1914–1991)
Sir Stephen Harry Waley-Cohen, 2nd Baronet (born 1946)
Heir: Lionel Robert Waley-Cohen (born 1974)

Arms

References

Kidd, Charles, Williamson, David (editors). Debrett's Peerage and Baronetage (1990 edition). New York: St Martin's Press, 1990.

Baronetcies in the Baronetage of the United Kingdom
Waley-Cohen family